John George Vlazny (born February 22, 1937) is an American prelate of the Roman Catholic Church. He served as the tenth archbishop of the Archdiocese of Portland in Oregon from 1997 to 2013. 

Vlazny previously served as an auxiliary bishop of the Archdiocese of Chicago in Illinois from 1983 to 1987 and as bishop of the Diocese of Winona in Minnesota from 1987 to 1997. On January 29, 2013, Pope Benedict XVI announced the acceptance of his resignation, with Bishop Alexander Sample to succeed him in Portland.

Biography

Early life 
John Vlazny was born on February 22, 1937, in Chicago, Illinois, to John and Marie (née Brezina) Vlazny, who were of Czech ancestry. His father was originally married to the sister of Vlazny's mother, Hattie Brezina, who died when their daughter, Marcella, was 13. In addition to his half-sister, John Vlazny has a younger sister, Marion. His father, who died from cancer when Vlazny was 18, owned a pharmacy in a three-story building at the corner of 18th and Throop Streets.

Vlazny received his early education at the parochial school of St. Gall Church in Chicago After attending Archbishop Quigley Preparatory Seminary in Chicago, he studied at St. Mary of the Lake Seminary in Mundelein, Illinois where he earned a Bachelor of Arts degree in 1958.

Vlazny continued his studies in Rome, where he attended the Pontifical North American College and the Pontifical Gregorian University. He earned a Bachelor of Sacred Theology in 1960 and a Licentiate of Sacred Theology in 1962.

Priesthood 
On December 20, 1961, Vlazny was ordained to the priesthood for the Archdiocese of Chicago by Archbishop Martin J. O'Connor in Rome at St. Peter's Basilica.

Following his return to Chicago, Vlazny served on the faculty of Quigley Preparatory North, later Archbishop Quigley Preparatory Seminary, in Chicago from 1963 to 1979. He was also dean of studies at Quigley North from 1969 to 1979.

In addition to his academic duties, Vlazny served as an associate pastor at St. Paul of the Cross Parish in Park Ridge, Illinois, from 1962 to 1963. He then served at St. Clement Parish in Lincoln Park, Illinois, from 1963 to 1968, and earned a Master of Arts degree in the Classics from the University of Michigan in 1967. Vlazny became an associate pastor at St. Aloysius Parish in the Wicker Park section of Chicago in 1968, and served as its pastor from 1979 to 1981. During this time, one of his seminarian assistants would go on to become Bishop Robert Barron. In 1972, Vlazny earned a Master of Education degree in School Administration from Loyola University Chicago.

From 1976 to 1977, Vlazny was president of the Presbyteral Senate for the archdiocese. He also served as a diocesan consultor and member of the Diocesan Clergy Personnel Board. He was appointed rector of Niles College Seminary in 1981.

Auxiliary Bishop of Chicago 
On October 18, 1983, Pope John Paul II appointed Vlazny as an auxiliary bishop of the Archdiocese of Chicago and Titular Bishop of Stagnum. He received his episcopal consecration on December 13, 1983,from Cardinal Joseph Bernardin, with Bishops Alfred Abramowicz and Nevin Hayes, O. Carm., serving as co-consecrators, at Holy Name Cathedral in Chicago. He took as his episcopal motto: "Go and Make Disciples".

As an auxiliary bishop, Vlazny served as episcopal vicar for Lake County,Illinois and the northwestern suburban Cook County, Illinois. He also worked closely with the Office of the Hispanic Apostolate.

Bishop of Winona
On May 19, 1987, John Paul II appointed  Vlazny as the sixth bishop of the Diocese of Winona. He was installed and consecrated on  July 29, 1987. During his tenure, Vlazny increased the involvement of the laity, decentralized the diocesan staff, and created the Offices of Youth and Family Life. He also started the tradition of the "Harvest Mass," an annual outdoor liturgy celebrated on a farm in the diocese.

As a member of the United States Conference of Catholic Bishops, Vlazny was elected chair of the Committee on Evangelization in 1993. In 1994, he asked Catholics to consider ending gambling as a source of revenue for parishes and schools.

Archbishop of Portland in Oregon
On October 28, 1997, John Paul II appointed Vlazny as the tenth Archbishop of the Archdiocese of Portland in Oregon. He was installed and consecrated on December 19, 1987, succeeding Archbishop Francis George.

On October 10, 2000, the archdiocese settled a lawsuit by 22 men who had been sexually abused as altar boys by Maurice Grammond, a parish priest in the archdiocese.  The victims lived in Portland, Seaside, Oregon and in Oakridge, Oregon.  Vlazny issued a statement of apology that was delivered in masses throughout the archdiocese.

In July 2004, the archdiocese became the first American diocese to file Chapter 11 bankruptcy in response to the Catholic sex abuse cases. Vlazny described his actions by saying, "This is not an effort to avoid responsibility. It is, in fact, the only way I can assure that other claimants can be offered fair compensation."

In January 2010, Vlazny defended his loan of money to Angel Armando Perez, an archdiocese priest, to cover legal expenses,  Perez had been indicted in Marion County, Oregon, on first-degree sexual abuse and abuse of a child in the display of sexually explicit conduct.  While condemning the alleged criminal actions. Vlazny expressed a need to help a beloved fellow priest.

In April 2010, Vlazny called for parishioners to cancel their subscriptions to The Oregonian, declaring it guilty of "Catholic bashing." The newspaper's editors, he said, "arrogantly scolded the church for its past failures in handling this matter of child sexual abuse." The newspaper had run an editorial, an editorial cartoon and a syndicated column by E.J. Dionne on how the church had dealt with sexual abuse crime. 

On January 29, 2013, Pope Benedict XVI announced the acceptance of Vlazny's resignation as archbishop of Portland, with Bishop Alexander Sample to succeed him.

Viewpoints

Euthanasia 
An opponent of assisted suicide, Vlazny supported the unsuccessful repeal of the Oregon Death with Dignity Act, saying,"Many have expressed a dread about what will happen when the power over life and death may be put into the hands of a society that is driven by economics, expedience and efficiency, a society that flees from suffering, weakness or limitations of any kind." In 1998, when the first legal assisted suicide occurred in Oregon, Vlazny declared that the death "can only bring anguish to those who have resisted the public policy initiatives that changed the law in Oregon."

Abortion 
During the 2004 U.S. presidential election, Vlazny said Catholic politicians who supported abortion rights, such as Democratic presidential nominee Senator John Kerry, should refrain from receiving Communion.

See also
 

 Catholic Church hierarchy
 Catholic Church in the United States
 Historical list of the Catholic bishops of the United States
 List of Catholic bishops of the United States
 Lists of patriarchs, archbishops, and bishops

References

External links

 Roman Catholic Archdiocese of Portland Official Site
Archbishop John G. Vlazny is a member the Catholic United Investment Trust
Biography of Archbishop John G. Vlazny

1937 births
Living people
20th-century Roman Catholic archbishops in the United States
21st-century Roman Catholic archbishops in the United States
Roman Catholic archbishops of Portland in Oregon
Loyola University Chicago alumni
Clergy from Chicago
Pontifical Gregorian University alumni
Pontifical North American College alumni
Religious leaders from Illinois
Roman Catholic Archdiocese of Chicago
Roman Catholic bishops of Winona
University of Michigan alumni
University of Saint Mary of the Lake alumni
Catholics from Illinois
American people of Czech descent